Cui Zhiyuan, born in Beijing in 1963, is a professor at the School of Public Policy and Management in Tsinghua University, Beijing and a leading member of the Chinese New Left through his work on alternatives to neo-liberal capitalism. 

Cui first gained fame as a post-graduate student in 1994 when he published an article named Institutional Innovation and the Second Thought Liberation. He then went on to publish a book on the Nanjie Village, which along with his previous publications earned him the reputation as one of the founding members of China's New Left movement. Cui was also one of the first scholars who had introduced Game theory into China. Cui is an admirer of James Meade's work on liberal socialism, reflected in his article ‘Xiaokang Socialism’: A Petty-Bourgeois Manifesto. Following Meade's theory, Cui was the first scholar who proposed a systematic social dividend program in China, including a "Chinese People's Permanent Trust Fund".

Cui edited Politics: The Central Texts, which is the selection of key texts from Roberto Mangabeira Unger’s three-volume Politics. His selective writings include The Dilemma of the Paradigm of the Invisible Hand: Soft-Budget-Constraint in the Capitalist Economy. Cui co-authored with Adam Przeworski Sustainable Democracy, and China: Human Development Report 1999 for UNDP. He was also one of the contributors to Whither China?: Intellectual Politics in Contemporary China. He also co-edited China and Globalization: Washington Consensus, Beijing Consensus or What? and was considered to be the first person who introduced the Beijing Consensus into the Chinese policy debate.

Cui also published a paper on Zhang Pengchun's role in drafting the United Nations’ Universal Declaration of Human Rights in 1948. Cui's article discusses the important implications of this discovery in the UN archive about Zhang's key role for the current Chinese political and cultural debates—transcending the dichotomy of “Western Centralism” and “Cultural Particularism”.

Cui’s works have also been translated into Korean, including Xiaokang Socialism: A Petty-Bourgeois Manifesto  and Is China Going Where?. The latter embodied Cui's famous article, "Institutional Innovation and the Second Thought". In addition, Roberto Mangabeira Unger's Politics: The Central Texts edited by Cui was also translated into Korean and published in South Korea. He was also invited to the International Conference on Basic Income held in Seoul in 2015 to give a Key Note speech concerning social dividend.

Cui was invited to give the Chun-tu Hsueh Distinguished Lecture, “Chinese Reform in light of James Meade’s Liberal Socialism”, Oxford University, December 5, 2014. In 2003, Cui was invited to LSE to give the Ralph Miliband Lecture, "The Bush Doctrine and Neoconservatism: A Chinese Perspective".

More recently, Cui has become known for his work on and as a proponent of the Chongqing model as a model for development. He argues that it could end China's dependence on exports and savings, reduce the growing economic divide between rural and urban areas as well as stimulate private business by way of public ownership and state planning. Cui is close to Chongqing's mayor Huang Qifan and has served as the associate director of State Asset Management Committee of Chongqing government from 2010 to 2011. His views are discussed in the essay-collection One China, Many Paths and Conditional Democracy: The Contemporary Debate on Political Reform in Chinese Universities.  He has also been critical of recent privatizations of state assets, and has called for more democracy within the party.

In 2015, Cui started a research project on “Experimental Governance: Its Promise and Limits in China”, in collaboration with Charles Sabel of Columbia University Law School, a leading scholar on experimental governance. “Experimental Governance”, Oxford Handbook on Governance, He gave a public lecture at the India-China Institute of New School for Social Research in April 2014 on ‘Understanding Xi Jinping’s Grand Reform Strategy” in light of experimental governance with Charles Sabel as a discussant. With his current and former students, Cui also runs a free weekly Wechat (the Chinese social media) publication titled “Experimental Governance”. They have so far published 80 issues with more than 2000 subscribers from academic, policy-research think tanks.

Personal life 

Cui's father was a nuclear engineer in Sichuan province.

References

External links
 Sample pages of an essay in The Chinese Model Of Modern Development
 Tsinghua University School of Public Policy and Management: Cui Zhiyuan public profile, English version, retrieved 6 August 2010.
 Tsinghua University School of Public Policy and Management: Cui Zhiyuan public profile, Chinese version, retrieved 6 August 2010.
 Cui Zhiyuan's website

Academic staff of Tsinghua University
Living people
1963 births
Chinese anti-capitalists
Chinese New Left
Chinese socialists